The Reed Flute Cave, also known as "the Palace of Natural Arts," is a landmark and tourist attraction in Guilin, Guangxi, China.  

The cave got its name from the type of reed growing outside, which can be made into flutes. Reed Flute Cave is filled with a large number of stalactites, stalagmites and other rock formations. Inside, there are more than 70 inscriptions written in ink, which can be dated back as far as 792 AD in the Tang Dynasty.  These aged inscriptions tell us that it has been an attraction in Guilin since ancient times. It was rediscovered in the 1940s by a group of refugees fleeing the Japanese troops. Nowadays, multicolored lighting artificially illuminates the cave. The Reed Flute Cave is filled with various stalactites and stalagmites, which are named according to what they look like and the legends surrounding them, Crystal Palace, Fish Tail Peak, and Dragon Pagoda. One giant stalactite is said to have been the magic spear of the Dragon King, used by the Monkey King Sun Wu Kong in the Chinese Buddhist classic, Journey to the West.

Notes

External links

 

Caves of Guangxi
Limestone caves
Karst formations of China
Show caves in China
Tourist attractions in Guilin